Naomi Melissa Graham is an American middleweight boxer. She is a staff sergeant and ammunition specialist in the United States Army. Graham is the first female active duty service member to fight for the U.S. at the Olympics.

Life
Graham was brought up in Fayetteville, North Carolina where she was the youngest of six children. A sister, Rachel, who was six years older than her took up professional boxing, but Naomi did not, as her mother objected. When she was 21, she was made homeless by her mother. In 2012, she was inspired by seeing women like Nicola Adams competing in the 2012 Summer Olympics. She joined the army in 2013 and two years later she joined the Army's World Class Athlete Program. In 2019, Graham won silver at the Pan American Games, which was later upgraded to gold due to her opponent's in the final disqualification for doping. Naomi became the first female active duty service member to compete for the U.S. at the Olympics. She was in Tokyo for the postponed 2020 Summer Olympics in 2021.

References

1989 births
Living people
American military Olympians
American women boxers
Boxers at the 2019 Pan American Games
Pan American Games gold medalists for the United States
Pan American Games medalists in boxing
Medalists at the 2019 Pan American Games
AIBA Women's World Boxing Championships medalists
Boxers from North Carolina
Sportspeople from Fayetteville, North Carolina
United States Army non-commissioned officers
Boxers at the 2020 Summer Olympics
Olympic boxers of the United States
21st-century American women